Isaac Beardsley Mitchell (1888 – 1977) was an American farmer and politician from New York.

Life
He was born in 1888 on the family farm near La Fargeville, Jefferson County, New York, the son of Hiram B. Mitchell (1845–1921) and Minnie (Beardsley) Mitchell (1846–1928). In 1908, he married Florence Staley (1885–1967), and they had two children. He raised Holstein Friesian cattle, and engaged in the dairy business.

He was elected on March 28, 1939, to the New York State Senate, to fill the vacancy caused by the death of Perley A. Pitcher. He remained in the State Senate until 1947, sitting in the 162nd, 163rd, 164th, 165th and 166th New York State Legislatures. He resigned his seat on June 12, 1947.

He died in 1977; and was buried at the Grove Cemetery in La Fargeville.

Sources

1888 births
1977 deaths
People from Jefferson County, New York
Republican Party New York (state) state senators
20th-century American politicians